Meredith Leigh Edwards (born March 15, 1984) is an American country music singer. She recorded an album, Reach, for Mercury Records Nashville in 2001. This album accounted for two singles on the Billboard country singles charts.

At the age of five, she was a member of the traveling choir the Mississippi Show Stoppers, along with Lance Bass of *NSYNC.

Lance had signed Meredith to his own management called Free Lance Entertainment. In 2001, she released her first CD, Reach, under the Mercury label. The album debuted at No. 24 on the Top Country Albums chart and was produced by Richard Marx. Its singles, "A Rose Is a Rose" and "The Bird Song", both charted on Hot Country Singles & Tracks (now Hot Country Songs) at No. 37 and No. 47 respectively. Edwards has not recorded since Reach.

Discography

Albums

Singles

Music videos

References

 Bass, Berry & Sims Attorney

External links
 

1984 births
Living people
American child singers
Singer-songwriters from Mississippi
People from Clinton, Mississippi
American country singer-songwriters
American women country singers
Mercury Records artists
21st-century American singers
21st-century American women singers
Country musicians from Mississippi